The women's freestyle 51 kilograms is a competition featured at the 2003 World Wrestling Championships, and was held at the Madison Square Garden in New York, United States from 12 to 14 September 2003.

Results

Preliminary round

Pool 1

Pool 2

Pool 3

Pool 4

Pool 5

Pool 6

Knockout round

References

Women's freestyle 51 kg